Urška Vesenjak (born 12 September 1982) is a former Slovenian female tennis player.

Vesenjak has won 4 singles titles and two doubles titles on the ITF tour in her career. On 18 December 2000, she reached her best singles ranking of world number 295. On 18 December 2000, she peaked at world number 295 in the doubles rankings.

Her twin, Maša Vesenjak is also a former female tennis player.
Vesenjak made her WTA tour debut at the 2001 Morocco Open.

ITF finals (6–6)

Singles (4–0)

Doubles (2–6)

References

External links 
 
 

1982 births
Living people
Sportspeople from Maribor
Slovenian female tennis players